A hakapik is a club, of Norwegian design, used for killing seals. The hakapik is a multipurpose hunting tool—a heavy wooden club, with a hammer head (used to crush a seal's skull), and a hook (used to drag away the carcass) on the end.

Regulation Canadian hakapiks consist of a metal ferrule that weighs at least 340 g (12 oz) with a slightly bent spike not more than 14 cm (5.5 in) in length on one side of the ferrule and a blunt projection not more than 1.3 cm (0.5 in) in length on the opposite side of the ferrule and that is attached to a wooden handle that measures not less than 105 cm (3.4 ft) and not more than 153 cm (5 ft) in length and not less than 3 cm and not more than 5.1 cm (2 in) in diameter.

The hakapik is favored by sealers because it allows them to kill the seal without damaging the pelt. Further, studies by American veterinary scientists on the use of the hakapik on the seal hunt carried out on Pribilof Islands of Alaska suggested that it is an efficient tool designed to kill the animal quickly and humanely when used correctly. A report by members of the Canadian Veterinary Medical Association in September 2002 confirmed this claim.

See also 
 Seal hunting
 Pickaroon

References and notes

Tools
Clubs (weapon)
Seal hunting